The Twentieth ministry of United Andhra Pradesh (which is referred as the First Y. S. Rajasekhara Reddy ministry) of the state of United Andhra Pradesh was formed on 14 May 2004 headed by Y. S. Rajasekhara Reddy as the Chief Minister following the 2004 Andhra Pradesh Legislative Assembly election. 24 member ministry was formed on 22 May 2004. The council of ministry was initially formed with 25 members including the chief minister. Later expanded on 26 April 2007 with 17 members taking the total number of members in the council to 41.

Background
Prior to 2004 Andhra Pradesh Legislative Assembly elections a pre-poll alliance was formed by the Indian National Congress, Telangana Rashtra Samithi, Communist Party of India and Communist Party of India (Marxist) to contest in the elections against the sole incumbent contender Telugu Desam Party. The pre-poll alliance succeeded in forming a new government in the state of Andhra Pradesh. Y. S. Rajasekhara Reddy formed a council of ministers consisting of 24 members initially and later expanding it twice once to induct the alliance partner TRS into the cabinet and several otherbers.
Pre-poll partner TRS joined the government with 6 ministers and quit the government later citing differences due to the Telangana issue.

Council of Ministers 

Key
  Resigned from office

See also 
 Andhra Pradesh Council of Ministers
 Second N. Chandrababu Naidu ministry
 Second Y. S. Rajasekhara Reddy ministry

References 

Andhra Pradesh ministries
Indian National Congress state ministries
2004 establishments in Andhra Pradesh
2004 in Indian politics
2009 disestablishments in India
Cabinets established in 2004
Cabinets disestablished in 2009